Horton is an unincorporated community in Logan County, Ohio.

References

Unincorporated communities in Logan County, Ohio
Unincorporated communities in Ohio